Habibur Rahman Hobi is a politician of Chuadanga District of Bangladesh and former member of parliament for the Chuadanga-2 constituency in 1988.

Career
Rahman was elected to parliament from Chuadanga-2 as a Jatiya Party candidate in 1988. He was defeated by Chuadanga-2 constituency as a candidate of Jatiya Party in the fifth parliamentary elections of 1991 and the seventh parliamentary elections of 12 June 1996. On June 29, 2011, he joined the Bangladesh Nationalist Party.

References

4th Jatiya Sangsad members
Bangladesh Nationalist Party politicians
Jatiya Party politicians
Living people
Year of birth missing (living people)